Guy W. Selby (April 1871 – May 9, 1968) was a Michigan politician.

Political life
He was elected as the Mayor of City of Flint in 1909 for the first of two 1 year terms. defeating the incumbent.  In the 1910 election, he defeated former mayor Austin D. Alvord.

Post-political life
In 1916, Selby was president of the Genesee County Bar Association.

References

Mayors of Flint, Michigan
1871 births
1968 deaths
20th-century American politicians